The Fleece Inn is a pub in Bretforton, in the Vale of Evesham, Worcestershire, England: the half-timbered building, over six hundred years old, has been a pub since 1848, and is now owned by the National Trust. The inn was extensively damaged by fire on 27 February 2004, and after repairs and rebuilding were completed the Fleece officially reopened on 18 June 2005.
The pub holds an annual asparagus festival and auction while there are three morris sides based at the pub: Pebworth, Belle d'Vain and Asum Gras. There is a regular folk night plus concerts and weddings in the medieval barn.

History
Owned by the National Trust, The Fleece Inn was originally built in the early 15th century as a longhouse (an early type of farmhouse accommodating both livestock and humans) by a prosperous yeoman farmer called Byrd. It later became a pub, which was rebuilt in the 17th century and remained in the Byrd family until 1977, when Lola Taplin bequeathed it to the National Trust. Lola was a direct descendant of Mr Byrd, and lived her entire life at the Fleece. She died at 77, having run the pub on her own for the last 30 years of her life. The Inn suffered serious fire damage after a fire broke out in the thatch in February 2004, and the business temporarily moved to a nearby barn during the 14 month long restoration.

Reputedly Oliver Cromwell's pewter dinner service was exchanged on the way to the battle of Worcester and this is on display at the pub. Even if this account is not true, it is an example of 17th century Jacobean English Pewter ware.

A curious medieval tradition also survives at the Fleece, preserved in accordance with Lola's wishes. This is the practice of chalking "witch circles" on the floor in front of each hearth to prevent witches from getting in through the chimneys. There are also "witch marks" on the inside of the door, to keep evil spirits out.

Culture
The BBC used The Fleece Inn and the surrounding village green for its 1994 production of Charles Dickens' novel Martin Chuzzlewit; the pub was renamed the "Blue Dragon" for the duration of shooting

References

External links
The Fleece Inn

National Trust - The Fleece Inn

Grade II listed pubs in Worcestershire
National Trust properties in Worcestershire
National Inventory Pubs
Timber framed buildings in England
Pubs in Worcestershire